Przemysław Szymiński (born 24 June 1994) is a Polish professional footballer who plays as a centre-back for Frosinone. Besides Poland, he has played in Italy.

Club career
He joined Serie B club Palermo in August 2017.

After being released in July 2019 due to the club's exclusion from Italian football, he joined Frosinone soon afterwards.

Career statistics

Club

References

External links
 
 

1994 births
Sportspeople from Katowice
Living people
Polish footballers
Association football defenders
Poland under-21 international footballers
Rozwój Katowice players
Wisła Płock players
Palermo F.C. players
Frosinone Calcio players
Ekstraklasa players
I liga players
II liga players
Serie B players
Polish expatriate footballers
Expatriate footballers in Italy
Polish expatriate sportspeople in Italy